Jail is a 2009 Indian Hindi-language prison drama film directed by Madhur Bhandarkar and starring Neil Nitin Mukesh, Aarya Babbar, Mugdha Godse and Manoj Bajpayee.

Plot
Jail tells the story of Parag Dixit (Neil Nitin Mukesh), who begins the story living a peaceful life with his girlfriend Mansi (Mugdha Godse). However, his life takes a turn when he ends up in jail due to a drug case in which he was falsely implicated; his good friend Keshav (Jignesh Joshi) is responsible for his misfortune. Shortly after getting promoted as Regional Manager of Max Finance, Parag Dixit is arrested in Bandra for firing at police and for possession of narcotics. His associate Keshav is grievously injured and is hospitalized in critical condition. 

Parag's widowed mother, Alka, and Air Hostess girlfriend, Manasi Pandit, retain Advocate Harish Bhatiya (Sandeep Mehta) to represent him at a preliminary bail hearing, but the Judge denies bail. Housed in an overcrowded barrack, having barely any room to move, Parag meets with a variety of people - both convicted and awaiting trial - including:

 Abdul Ghani (Rahul Singh) - a person waiting for bail after he accidentally killed a man troubling his wife
 Kabir Malik (Arya Babbar) - a convict and henchman of Bababhai
 Galib Suratwala, Nawab (Manoj Bajpayee) - a prisoner who now works in the jail
 Joe D'souza (Ali Quli Mirza) - a person accused of a hit and run accident
 Bababhai - a Don who stays in a special room and conducts criminal activities by bribing police

Parag is tortured mentally by the jail, but he eventually learns to adjust to his new situation. Parag again appears in court after a charge-sheet is filed. Due to the offences' seriousness and the fear of tampering with evidence and witnesses, he is denied bail. Months later, Keshav dies while Parag still awaits trial. In jail, several storylines intertwine. Parag befriends Nawab, who is sympathetic to him. Ghani's wife leaves him, and he agrees to become Bababhai's henchman and is released on bail. Although, he finds out his wife has married another man and proceeds to take his own life. 

Galib escapes from jail by bribing the police. Joe gets bail and celebrates by donating some of his items which anger Parag, who subsequently beats him up. Parag is transferred to solitary confinement as punishment. After ten days, he is released on request of Nawab. He is sleep-deprived, but he is allowed to go to the hospital to meet his mother and Mansi with the help of Kabir. Nawab is angry at him and requests him to stay away from the gangsters as they demand a lot in return. He narrates the story of how his little brother, under the influence of a gangster, was involved in a murder case, and Nawab was forced to kill him as well as the gangster. 

Two years later, during Parag's final trial, he is convicted under the Drug Act and is sentenced to rigorous imprisonment of 10 years, out of which two years he has already served. He, therefore, still has eight years left to serve in prison. Embittered by the abuse and without any faith in the overburdened system, Parag contemplates suicide. Parag asks Kabir to ask Bababhai to help him get out of jail. He agrees to do anything in return. Kabir agrees. A routine transfer of jail is happening; Parag is transferred to Nasik jail and Kabir to Kolhapur. 

During the transfer, a corrupt police officer places Parag in Kabir's transport. Nawab senses it but stays quiet. During the Nasik jail trip, Kabir and his gang cause an accident and escape, but Parag stays back. Nawab is informed about the events by Jailor Arvind Joshi (Chetan Pandit) and is happy. In Kolhapur jail, Parag tries to regain hope about his life and circumstances. Six months later, Mansi hires a new lawyer (Atul Kulkarni), and Parag appears for retrial in the high court. The new lawyer presents new evidence and points out the flaws committed by the trial court. Parag is acquitted. He and Mansi visit the jail to meet Nawab.

Cast

 Neil Nitin Mukesh as Parag Dixit
 Mugdha Godse as Mansi Pandit
 Rahul Singh as Abdul Ghani
 Manoj Bajpayee as Nawab also narrator
 Arya Babbar as Kabir Malik
 Chetan Pandit as Jailor Arvind Joshi
 Ghanshyam Garg as Piloo Yadav
 Sayali Bhagat in a Special Appearance
 Kaveri Jha as Sabina
 Mukesh Tyagi as a CEO
 Sandeep Mehta as Harish Bhatia (Parag's lawyer)
 Navni Parihar as Parag's Mother
 Ali Quli Mirza as Joe D'Souza
 G.K Desai Cricket Bookie Desai Bhai
 Jignesh Joshi as Keshav Rathod
 Atul Kulkarni as Parag Dixit's next lawyer
 Nassar Abdulla as a Judge
 Raj Nair as Anna
 Ashok Samarth as DCP Nagesh Patil
 Manish Mehta as Galib Suratwala

Soundtrack
The music of the film is composed by Shaarib-Toshi and Shamir Tandon. The lyrics are penned by Ajay K. Garg, A. M. Turaz and Sandeep Nath. The music was released on 3 October 2009.

Track listing

References

External links
 
 
 Jail on YouTube
 

2000s Hindi-language films
2009 films
Indian thriller drama films
Indian prison films
2009 thriller drama films
Films shot in India
Films directed by Madhur Bhandarkar
Films scored by Sharib-Toshi
Films scored by Shamir Tandon
2009 drama films